Angelo Tsakopoulos (born August 4, 1936) is a Greek American businessman and real estate developer in Sacramento, California and the founder and owner of AKT Development. Tsakopoulos attended California State University, Sacramento.

Tsakopoulos was a minority owner of the Sacramento Mountain Lions franchise of the short lived United Football League along his son, Angelo Tsakopoulos, Jr., who presently serves as president of AKT Development. In 2002, Tsakopoulos purchased a 70,000 volume collection on Hellenistic civilization and donated it to the library of California State University, Sacramento where it is available for use by the community.

Early life and career
Tsakopoulos was born in Rizes, a small village in Arcadia, Greece. He arrived in United States with his family in 1951, eventually settling in Sacramento, California after having lived in New York City and the Chicago, Illinois area. His older brother, George, who would arrive in the U.S. in 1955 after having been wounded in the Greek Civil War, would later also become a major investor with his brother in Sacramento real estate.
Tsakopoulos founded Sacramento's AKT Development Inc. in 1964, which was when the company made its first real estate sale, the business controls 47,000 acres around Sacramento. George Tsakopoulos, his brother, died at the age of 81 in Sacramento, California,

Tsakopoulos' daughter, Eleni Kounalakis, served as president of AKT Development. She served as United States Ambassador to Hungary from 2010 to 2013 and is the Lieutenant Governor of California. His other daughter, Chrysa (Chrysanthy Panagiota) Tsakopoulos, married George Demos, a former United States Securities and Exchange Commission prosecutor and Congressional candidate. His son, Kyriakos Tsakopoulos, is the current president and CEO of AKT Development and a former alumni trustee of Columbia University.

Angelo and Eleni provided uncoordinated financial support to Phil Angelides election via a nominally independent organization.

Clean Water Act violation
Tsakopoulos was fined by the United States Environmental Protection Agency for a violation of the Clean Water Act. Tsakopoulos sued the government and was able to bring his case to the U.S. Supreme Court, though the Court ruled against him.

"The case grew out of Tsakopoulos' preparations to subdivide part of the  Borden Ranch into apple orchards and vineyards. He used a method of soil preparation called deep plowing or deep ripping to loosen the clay subsurface of nearly  so that the roots of deep-growing trees and vines could penetrate.

"The government said that was true only if the plowing did not change the character of the farmland."

Justice Anthony Kennedy had to recuse himself from the case because of his acquaintance with Tsakopoulos and only eight justices were left deciding the case. The ruling turned out to be a 4–4 tie. Because of the tie, the ruling against Tsakopoulos by the 9th Circuit Court of Appeals was automatically affirmed.

See also
 John Sitilides, (The Western Policy Center)

References

External links
 Article On The Supreme Court Case
 Businessman Of The Year Award
 The Tsakopoulos Hellenic Collection

Living people
1936 births
American people of Greek descent
20th-century American businesspeople
California State University, Sacramento alumni
Sacramento Mountain Lions
United Football League (2009–2012) owners